Zaza is a 1923 American silent romantic drama film directed and produced by Allan Dwan, and starring Gloria Swanson. This film is based on the 1899 French play of the same name produced on Broadway by David Belasco and starring Mrs. Leslie Carter. The film was shot at Paramount's Astoria Studios in New York City.

A previous film version was released by Paramount in 1915 starring Pauline Frederick. A third version, directed by George Cukor and starring Claudette Colbert, was released in 1939.

Cast

Preservation
A print of Zaza is housed at the George Eastman House and the Library of Congress.

References

External links

 
 
 
 Lobby poster

1923 films
1923 romantic drama films
American romantic drama films
American silent feature films
American black-and-white films
Famous Players-Lasky films
American films based on plays
Films directed by Allan Dwan
Films set in the 1890s
Films set in France
Films shot in New York City
Remakes of American films
American remakes of French films
Paramount Pictures films
Surviving American silent films
Films shot at Astoria Studios
1920s American films
Silent romantic drama films
Silent American drama films